Sylvan Lake is a lake in Cass County, Minnesota, in the United States.

The name of Sylvan Lake is descriptive, for in mythology Sylvan is a wooded place.

See also
List of lakes in Minnesota

References

Lakes of Minnesota
Lakes of Cass County, Minnesota